Carlos Augusto Vásquez (born December 6, 1982 in Sucre, Venezuela) is a Venezuelan former professional baseball pitcher.

Career
Vásquez was originally signed as an undrafted free agent by the Chicago Cubs on February 21, 2000. Vásquez missed the  season after undergoing Tommy John surgery on November 2, 2000.

In , Vásquez spent the season with the Single-A Boise Hawks. His 15 starts led the Northwest League, complemented by a 4.26 ERA and a 5-6 record. In , Vásquez played for the Single-A Lansing Lugnuts. He made 23 starts in 24 games and had a 10-13 record despite a good ERA of 3.74.

On April 4, 2005, he was suspended for 15 games for violating the league's joint drug prevention and treatment program. Regardless, he did not play at all in 2005, following surgery on his left shoulder. In , Vásquez became a full-time relief pitcher. Splitting the season at Daytona and West Tenn, the Cubs Double-A affiliate, he played in a combined 54 games with a 6-5 record and a 2.75 ERA.

On November 16, 2006, Vásquez was traded to the Chicago White Sox along with David Aardsma for Neal Cotts. In his first season in the White Sox organization, Vásquez split the  season with the Double-A Birmingham Barons and the Triple-A Charlotte Knights. Making a combined 52 relief appearances, he had a 4-3 record with a 2.70 ERA.

On March 12, 2008, Vásquez was released by the White Sox. Vasquez signed with the Red Sox in March 2008, but was released on August 27, 2008.

External links

1982 births
Living people
Águilas del Zulia players
Baseball pitchers
Baseball players suspended for drug offenses
Birmingham Barons players
Boise Hawks players
Camden Riversharks players
Cardenales de Lara players
Caribes de Anzoátegui players
Caribes de Oriente players
Charlotte Knights players
Daytona Cubs players
Jacksonville Suns players
Lancaster JetHawks players
Lansing Lugnuts players
Navegantes del Magallanes players
New Orleans Zephyrs players
People from Sucre (state)
Portland Sea Dogs players
Tigres de Aragua players
Venezuelan expatriate baseball players in the United States
Venezuelan sportspeople in doping cases
West Tennessee Diamond Jaxx players
World Baseball Classic players of Venezuela
2009 World Baseball Classic players